Shastrartha is a type of intellectual debate prevalent in India. It was a kind of philosophical and religious debates in which scholars participated to reveal the inner meaning (अर्थ) of Hindu scriptures known as the shastras  (शास्त्र). There were three types of Shastrartha prevalent in India, namely, the Vadakatha (healthy discussions which targeted the truth), the Jalpakatha (where two contradictory interpretations contested with each other) and the Vitandakatha (which attacked the other views without establishing their own view). The Vada katha was done among the Guru and Shishya or among the people belonging to the same philosophical school. While the latter two were done among the people of different schools or with the antagonistic sects.  People vied with each other for winning the contest by showing their language of the ancient scriptures

See also
Debates in ancient India
Nyaya Sutra

References

Hindu philosophical concepts